Full-length media whose entire plot takes place during one day.

Novels

1982, Janine
253
The 25th Hour
A Girl in Winter
A Single Man
The Act of Roger Murgatroyd
After Dark
Alastalon salissa
The Almost Moon
Angels & Demons
April Morning
Arlington Park
The Art of the Engine Driver
Between the Acts
Billiards at Half-past Nine
The Birthday Party
Breathing Lessons
The British Museum Is Falling Down
Bunny Lake Is Missing
By Night in Chile
The Cambridge Quintet
Concluding
Cosmopolis
Cosmétique de l'ennemi
The Da Vinci Code
The Day Lasts More Than a Hundred Years
Death of a River Guide
The Dinner
Do Androids Dream of Electric Sheep?
Eleven
Eleven Hours
The Fear Index
Fear Nothing
From Nine to Nine
Gerald's Party
Golf in the Kingdom
Grado. Süße Nacht
Hogfather
The Hours
The House in Paris
I Am Mary Dunne
If Nobody Speaks of Remarkable Things
Injury Time
Intimacy
Jokers Wild
Joy
Last Post
The Mezzanine
Mrs Dalloway
Night Boat to Tangier
Odd Thomas
One Day in the Life of Ivan Denisovich
One Night @ the Call Center
Operation Hell Gate and the other novels in the 24 series
Party Going
The Penultimate Peril
The Pigeon
The Poorhouse Fair
Popcorn
Prajapati
The Reluctant Fundamentalist
Room Temperature
Saturday
Second Thoughts
Seize the Day
Snuff
Serious Sweet
The Taking of Pelham One Two Three
This Town Will Never Let Us Go
Time, Forward!
Today Will Be Different
Tomorrow
Ulysses
Under the Volcano
Untouchable
Windows on the World
The Winner Stands Alone

Television shows 
24, each season of which is set over 24 hours

Films

 4 Months, 3 Weeks and 2 Days
 10 Items or Less
 11:14
 12 Angry Men (1957)
 12 Angry Men (1997)
 13 Beloved
 16 Blocks
 1917
 1941
 200 Cigarettes
 24: Redemption
 25th Hour
 4:44 Last Day on Earth
 30 Minutes or Less
 80 Minutes
 88 Minutes
 A Cry in the Night
 Ad-lib Night
 Adventures in Babysitting
 After Hours
 Ah, Wilderness!
 Airplane!
 Airplane II: The Sequel
 Airport
 Airport 1975
 Albino Alligator
 Aliens in the Attic
 All Dogs Go To Heaven 2
 An All Dogs Christmas Carol
 All Night Long
 American Graffiti
 Are We There Yet?
 Arsenic and Old Lace
 Arthur Christmas
 Assault on Precinct 13 (1976)
 Assault on Precinct 13 (2005)
 Atom Heart Mother
 Attack the Block
 Au Revoir Taipei
 Baby's Day Out
 Bad Day at Black Rock
 Bad Times at the El Royale
 Barbershop
 Beauty and the Beast: The Enchanted Christmas
 Before Midnight
 Before Sunrise
 Before Sunset
 Before We Go
 Ben Is Back
 Bicycle Thieves
 Blackmail (1929)
 The Blob
 Bodies Bodies Bodies
 The Boys in the Band (1970)
 The Boys in the Band (2020)
 The Breakfast Club
 Britain in a Day
 Broken Arrow (1996)
 Buffalo '66
 Bullet Train
 Buried
 Burnt by the Sun
 Can't Hardly Wait
 The Captain
 Car Wash 
 Carnage (2011)
 The Cat in the Hat
 Cat on a Hot Tin Roof
 Cause for Alarm!
 Celebration Day
 Cellular
 Certified Copy
 Changing Lanes
 Changing the Game
 Chennaiyil Oru Naal
 A Christmas Carol (1938) 
 A Christmas Carol (1984) 
 A Christmas Carol (1999) 
 A Christmas Carol (2009) 
 Cinderella III: A Twist in Time
 Cléo from 5 to 7
 Clerks.
 Clockwise
 Cloverfield
 Clue
 Cocktail (2010)
 Collateral
 The Commuter
 Connected
 Cop Car
 Cornered!
 Cosmopolis
 Crank
 Crash Landing
 Crayon Shin-chan: Fierceness That Invites Storm! Yakiniku Road of Honor
 Criminal
 Critters
 The Daytrippers
 Dazed and Confused
 Death and the Maiden
 The Debut
 Déficit
 Demon Slayer: Kimetsu no Yaiba the Movie: Mugen Train
 Detective Conan: Private Eye in the Distant Sea
 Detective Conan: The Private Eyes' Requiem
 Detective Story
 Deterrence
 Devil (2010)
 Die Hard
 Die Hard 2
 Die Hard with a Vengeance
 Digimon Frontier: Island of Lost Digimon
 Digimon Savers: Ultimate Power! Activate Burst Mode!!
 The Dinner
 Dirty Mary, Crazy Larry
 Do the Right Thing
 Dog Day Afternoon
 Dr. Strangelove
 Drake & Josh Go Hollywood
 Dredd
 Dude, Where's My Car?
 Duel
 Dutchman
 Earthquake (1974)
 Ek Ruka Hua Faisla
 Elephant
 An Elephant Sitting Still
 Empire Records
 Escape from New York
 Executive Decision
 The Eye Creatures
 Fail-Safe
 Faithful
 Falling Down
 Fantastic Voyage
 The Fatal Encounter
 Ferris Bueller's Day Off
 The Fire Within
 First Blood
 First Day High
 Flightplan
 Four Rooms
 Frailty
 Free Fire
 Friday (1995)
 Friday (2012)
 Friday After Next
 From Dusk Till Dawn
 The Front Page
 Fruitvale Station
 Fun Size
 Gideon's Day
 Glass Onion: A Knives Out Mystery
 The Goonies
 Grand Theft Auto
 Grandma
 Gravity (2013)
 The Great Train Robbery (1903)
 Grilled
 Grown Ups 2
 Guess Who's Coming to Dinner
 Halloween II (1981)
 Halloweentown
 Happy Death Day
 Hard Candy
 Harold & Kumar Go to White Castle
 The Hateful Eight
 Heart of America
 The High and the Mighty
 High Noon
 The Hollywood Knights
 Holy Motors
 Home Sweet Home
 Honey, I Blew Up the Kid
 Honey, We Shrunk Ourselves
 The House of Yes
 House Party
 House Party 4: Down to the Last Minute
 I Love You, Beth Cooper
 I Wanna Hold Your Hand
 The Ice Harvest
 The Iceman Cometh (1973)
 The Incident
 Intimate Strangers (2018)
 Intruder (1989)
 Invasion of the Saucer Men
 It's a Mad, Mad, Mad, Mad World
 Jeff, Who Lives at Home
 Jingle All the Way
 Judgment Night
 Juno and the Paycock
 Kids
 The Killing Jar
 The Killing Room
 Kings and Desperate Men
 La Haine
 La Notte
 Laid to Rest
 Las Vegas Bloodbath
 The Last Hurrah
 Last Night (1998)
 Lebanon
 Life in a Day (2011)
 Locke
 Long Day's Journey into Night (1962)
 Long Day's Journey into Night (1973)
 The Longest Daycare
 Losin' It
 Ma Rainey's Black Bottom 
 Mad City 
 Magnolia
 Malcolm & Marie
 Mallrats
 Margin Call
 Mars Needs Moms
 Miss Pettigrew Lives for a Day
 Mixed Nuts
 Money Monster
 Monster Mash (1995)
 The Muppet Christmas Carol
 Murder by Death
 My Dear Enemy
 My Dinner with Andre
 My Soul to Take
 The Negotiator
 Nerve (2016)
 New Year's Eve (2011)
 New York Minute
 Next Friday
 Nick of Time
 'night, Mother
 Night of the Living Dead (1968)
 Night of the Living Dead (1990)
 Night on Earth
 Nine Lives (2005)
 Nine Queens
 Non-Stop
 Nothing to Lose
 No Through Road
 Odd Man Out
 Offside
 On the Town
 One Day in the Life of Ivan Denisovich
 One Fine Day
 One Wonderful Sunday
 Orr Eravuu 
 Our Relations 
 Out for Justice
 The Pagemaster
 Pandorum
 Panic Room
 The Paper
 Penny Dreadful
 Perfect Strangers (2016)
 Phantom of the Megaplex
 Phone Booth
 Picnic
 Pieces of April
 The Polar Express
 Poseidon
 Premature
 Premium Rush
 The Prince and the Pauper (1990)
 Project X (2012)
 Psycho Cop
 Psycho Cop 2
 PTU
 Quarantine (2008)
 Quarantine 2: Terminal
 Quick Change
 Radioland Murders
 Rat Race
 Rebel Without a Cause
 REC
 Red Eye
 Repo! The Genetic Opera
 The Return of the Living Dead
 Rock 'n' Roll Nightmare
 The Rocky Horror Picture Show
 Roger Dodger
 Room in Rome
 Rope
 The Rugrats Movie
 Run (1991)
 Run Lola Run
 Running Scared (2006)
 The Russians Are Coming, the Russians Are Coming
 Sanctum
 Scooby-Doo! in Where's My Mummy?
 Scrooge (1935) 
 Scrooge (1951)
 Scrooge (1970)
 The Set-Up
 Seven Chances
 Short Eyes
 Shrek Forever After
 Shutter
 Silent House
 The Silent House
 A Single Man
 Sixteen Candles
 The Sitter
 Slacker
 Slashers
 The Slumber Party Massacre
 Snake Eyes (1998)
 The Song Remains the Same
 Sorry, Wrong Number 
 Source Code
 A Special Day
 Speed (1994)
 Stan Helsing
 The Strangers
 Stress Is Three
 The Stupids
 Sudden Death
 Suddenly
 Superbad
 The Swimmer
 Take Me Home Tonight
 The Outfit (2022 film) 
 The Taking of Pelham One Two Three (1974)
 The Taking of Pelham 123 (2009)
 Tape
 Three
 Three O'Clock High
 Through a Glass Darkly
 The Thursday
 Timecode
 The Towering Inferno
 Touch of Evil
 Traffic (2011)
 Training Day
 The Trench
 Trick 'r Treat
 Turbulence
 Twitches
 Two Girls and a Guy
 Two-Minute Warning
 Ultraviolet
 United 93
 Unstoppable (2010)
 Vacancy
 Vacancy 2: The First Cut
 Valentine's Day (2010)
 Vantage Point
 A Very Harold & Kumar Christmas
 Waiting...
 The Warriors
 We All Die Alone
 Wet Hot American Summer
 Wet Wilderness
 What Happened Was
 When a Killer Calls
 While She Was Out
 White House Down
 Who Is Harry Kellerman and Why Is He Saying Those Terrible Things About Me?
 Who's Afraid of Virginia Woolf?
 Willy's Wonderland
 Winter Light
 Women in Trouble
 World Trade Center
 Zathura: A Space Adventure
 Zulu

See also
 :Category:Novels set in one day

References

Further reading
 On films:
 
 
 On literature:
 
 
 
 

One d
Narratology
Entertainment lists
Day
Day